Lazar Mojsov (19 December 1920 – 25 August 2011) was a Macedonian journalist, communist politician and diplomat from SFR Yugoslavia.

Biography
Mojsov received his doctoral degree from the University of Belgrade's Law School. 

He fought for the anti-fascist partisans in World War II and continued to rise through the ranks of the Communist Party after 1945. He was attorney general of the Socialist Republic of Macedonia from 1948 to 1951. During the next two decades, he served as a member of the parliaments of SFR Yugoslavia and SR Macedonia and as a newspaper editor.

Meanwhile, he began a diplomatic career, serving as Yugoslav ambassador to the Soviet Union and Mongolia from 1958 to 1961 and as ambassador to Austria from 1967 to 1969. From 1969 to 1974, he served as Yugoslav ambassador to the United Nations, Guyana and Jamaica.

From 1974 to 1982, Mojsov was deputy foreign minister of Yugoslavia, and, from 1977 to 1978, he was the president of the United Nations General Assembly. From 1980 to 1981, he served as Chairman of the Presidium of the Central Committee of the League of Communists of Yugoslavia, and from May 1982 to May 1984, he was the foreign minister. From 1984 to 1989, he was a member of the collective presidency of Yugoslavia and was its chairman from 1987 to 1988.

Mojsov also lectured and wrote on the subject of international relations.

On 25 August 2011 Mojsov died at the age of 90 in Belgrade. He was laid to rest in Belgrade's Novo groblje cemetery's Alley of Distinguished Citizens.

References

1920 births
2011 deaths
Yugoslav diplomats
League of Communists of Macedonia politicians
Presidents of the Socialist Federal Republic of Yugoslavia
Presidents of the United Nations General Assembly
Permanent Representatives of Yugoslavia to the United Nations
Ambassadors of Yugoslavia to the Soviet Union
Macedonian atheists
Yugoslav Partisans members
University of Belgrade Faculty of Law alumni
People from Negotino
Ambassadors of Yugoslavia to Mongolia
Ambassadors of Yugoslavia to Austria
Ambassadors of Yugoslavia to Guyana
Ambassadors of Yugoslavia to Jamaica
League of Communists – Movement for Yugoslavia politicians
Foreign ministers of Yugoslavia
Yugoslav journalists